Barbara Buckley (born November 23, 1960 in Philadelphia, Pennsylvania) is an American attorney and Democratic Party politician who served as a member of the Nevada Assembly, representing Clark County District 8 from 1994 to 2011.  She served as Assembly Speaker from 2007 to 2011, the first woman in Nevada history to serve as Speaker. She also served as Majority Leader of the Assembly from 2001 to 2007. Recently enacted term limits prevented Buckley from seeking re-election in the 2010 elections. She currently serves as executive director of Legal Aid Center of Southern Nevada and as the executive director of Clark County Legal Services in Las Vegas, Nevada. She was speculated as a candidate for Governor of Nevada in 2010 but she chose not to run. She considered running in 2014 but again declined to do so, saying that "I am not getting back into the political world".

Personal life
Buckley received a Bachelor of Arts (B.A.) degree from the University of Nevada, Las Vegas in 1986 and a Juris Doctor (J.D.) degree from the University of Arizona in 1989.

Buckley is married to Chan Kendrick and together they have two children named Aiden and Ford.

See also
List of female speakers of legislatures in the United States

References

External links 
Nevada General Assembly - Barbara Buckley official government website
Project Vote Smart - Representative Barbara E. Buckley (NV) profile
Follow the Money - Barbara Buckley
2006 2004 2002 2000 1998 1996 1994 campaign contributions
Clark County Legal Services (CCLS) official website

1960 births
Living people
Members of the Nevada Assembly
Speakers of the Nevada Assembly
Women state legislators in Nevada
Politicians from Philadelphia
Politicians from Las Vegas
University of Nevada, Las Vegas alumni
Women in Nevada politics
21st-century American women